Pantoic acid is the alpha hydroxy acid with the formula HOCH2C(CH3)2CH(OH)CO2H. The compound is almost always encountered in a biological context, as an aqueous solution of its conjugate base pantoate HOCH2C(CH3)2CH(OH)CO2-. The amide of pantoic acid with β-alanine is pantothenic acid (vitamin B5), a component of coenzyme A.

Biosynthesis
Its biosynthesis proceeds from ketoisovalerate by hydroxymethylation:
(CH3)2CHC(O)CO2− + CH2O  →  HOCH2(CH3)2CC(O)CO2−

This conversion is catalyzed by ketopantoate hydroxymethyltransferase, which gives ketopantoate.  Ketopantoate is reduced by ketopantoate reductase to pantoate, using NADH as the hydride source.

The amide derived from pantoic acid and GABA is the pharmaceutical drug hopantenic acid.

References

External links
 

Alpha hydroxy acids
Diols